Hypoctonus formosus is a species of arachnids belonging to the family Thelyphonidae.

Subspecies
 Hypoctonus formosus formosus (Bulter, 1872)
 Hypoctonus formosus insularis (Oates, 1889)

Distribution
This species is endemic to Myanmar.

References

 Butler (1872) A monograph of the genus Thelyphonus. Annals and Magazine of Natural History, ser. 4: vol. 10, p. 200–206.

External links

Animals described in 1872
Uropygi
Endemic fauna of Myanmar